Arthur Samuel Wakim (13 February 1937 – 4 December 2022) was a Canadian lawyer and Progressive Conservative party member of the House of Commons of Canada. A member of the Queen's Counsel, he practised law in Toronto, Ontario.

Born in Saint John, New Brunswick, Wakim earned his undergraduate degree at St. Francis Xavier University (B. Sc., 1959) where he met future prime minister Brian Mulroney. The two became close friends. He earned his law degree at the University of New Brunswick in 1962, and was called to the bar in the same year. In Ontario, he was called to the bar in 1965.

He represented Ontario's Don Valley East electoral district which he won in the 1979 federal election. After serving his only term, the 31st Canadian Parliament, he was defeated in the 1980 federal election by David Smith of the Liberal party.

In 2007, he represented Brian Mulroney in litigation with businessman Karlheinz Schreiber. He also represented the former Prime Minister in litigation with the journalist Peter C. Newman. Wakim died on 4 December 2022, aged 85.

Electoral record

References

External links
 

1937 births
2022 deaths
Members of the House of Commons of Canada from Ontario
Politicians from Saint John, New Brunswick
Progressive Conservative Party of Canada MPs
St. Francis Xavier University alumni
Canadian King's Counsel
Canadian politicians of Lebanese descent